The NBA 25th Anniversary Team was chosen on December 11, 1971, to honor the 25th anniversary of the founding  of the National Basketball Association (NBA) as the Basketball Association of America (BAA) in 1946. It was the first anniversary team in the NBA. This team was meant to be an All-NBA Team for that period. Up until that time, All-NBA Teams only consisted of  2 teams (First and Second), so this Team also only consists of 2 teams/10 players (4 forwards, 2 centers, and 4 guards). The selections were restricted to retired players.

Selections
List of 25th Anniversary Team players, sorted by position and vote received.

F Bob Pettit          
F Dolph Schayes       
F Paul Arizin         
F Joe Fulks           
C Bill Russell        
C George Mikan        
G Bob Cousy           
G Bill Sharman        
G Bob Davies          
G Sam Jones
Coach Red Auerbach

Russell was the only unanimous selection to the team. Furthermore, all nominees of the 25th Anniversary Team besides Feerick and Zaslofky have also been inducted into Naismith Memorial Basketball Hall of Fame.

In 1980, only four players of the 25th Anniversary Team were selected into NBA 35th Anniversary Team (Pettit, Cousy, Russell, and Mikan). However, along with them, four other players of this team (Arizin, Jones, Schayes, Sharman) were selected into NBA 50 Greatest Players of All-Time in 1996 and the NBA 75th Anniversary Team in 2021.

Selection process
A panel selected 25 nominees from all eligible players, made up from 10 Forwards, 10 Guards,  and 5 Centers. Then every NBA player that had been named All NBA 1st Team up to that time gave his vote. The four top voted forwards, two top voted centers, and four top voted guards made the team.

Eligibility requirements
To be eligible as a nominee, a player must (by 1971):
 have completed his career, and 
 have been named All-NBA Team at least once.

Selection panels
Red Auerbach, Ned Irish, Eddie Gottlieb, Haskell Cohen, Danny Biasone, Lester Harrison, Fred Zollner, Ben Kerner, Fred Schaus, and Bob Feerick.

Nominees
List of nominees, sorted by position, last name (players denoted with an asterisk had been inducted into the Basketball Hall Of Fame), and career years.

Forwards

Paul Arizin*,	1950–1962
Joe Fulks*,	1946–1954
Harry Gallatin*,	1948–1958
Tom Gola*,		1955–1966
Vern Mikkelsen*,	1949–1959
Bob Pettit*,	1954–1965
Jim Pollard*,	1947–1955
Tom Heinsohn*,	1956–1965
Dolph Schayes*,	1948–1964
George Yardley*,	1953–1960

Centers

Neil Johnston*,	1951–1959
Ed Macauley*,	1949–1959
George Mikan*,	1946–1954, 1955–1956
Bill Russell*,	1956–1969
Maurice Stokes*,	1955–1958

Guards

Richie Guerin*,	1956–1970
Bob Cousy*,	1950–1963, 1969–1970
Bob Davies*,	1946–1955
Bob Feerick,	1945–1950
Sam Jones*,	1957–1969
Slater Martin*,	1949–1960
Dick McGuire*,	1949–1960
Bill Sharman*,	1950–1961
Bobby Wanzer*,	1947–1957
Max Zaslofsky,	1946–1956

See also 
 The W25, the 25th anniversary team of the NBA's sister league, the WNBA

References
General
NBA.com – This Date in History – December 11, 1971
APBR.org – NBA Silver Anniversary Team (1971)

Specific

25
1971–72 NBA season